Tarbagatay is a district of the  East Kazakhstan and Abai
regions in eastern Kazakhstan. The administrative center of the district is the selo of Aksuat. Population:

Climate
Very continental. Winter is cold (in January average temperature −22 °С, −30 °С) and summer is hot (in July average temperature +25 °С, +35 °С). Very poor precipitation (200–300 mm/year) mostly in winter season

Toponym
The name Tarbagatay derives from Mongolian (Tarbagan marmot) as marmot mountains. (Technically, tarbagatay means "with marmots" or "having marmots" in Mongolian, but tagh ~ taw ~ tay may be misinterpreted as meaning "mountain" by speakers of Turkic languages, such as the Kazakh language.)

Administrative-territorial system
17 rural districts, 65 villages.

Demographics
Ethnic groups (2009):
Kazakh 98.7%
Russian 1.1%
Tatar 0.1%
German 0.1%
Others : 0.1%

Economy
Agrocultural (meat, fish,  flour, bread)
GDP 503 900 000 tenge ~ $3 427 900 (2008)

Sights
Borytastagan
Syn-tas
Atyn oba
Alty oba

References

External links
Subdivisions of Kazakhstan in local languages
Statistic Agency of East Kazakhstan Region
Akim of Tarbagatay District
  HB Paksoy, "Z.V. Togan: The Origins of the Kazaks and the Ozbeks," Central Asian Survey 11 (3), 1992

Read more: Culture of Uzbekistan - history, people, clothing, traditions, women, beliefs, food, customs, family http://www.everyculture.com/To-Z/Uzbekistan.html#ixzz1nh383uYB

Districts of Kazakhstan
East Kazakhstan Region